Bomadi is an Ijaw local government area in Delta State, Nigeria.  The town lies on the bank of the Forcados River.

It has eleven communities, namely: Ogriagbene, Esanma, Akugbene, Ogbein-ama, Bomadi, Kpakiama, Ekamuta-gbene, Azebiri, Ogodobiri, Okoloba and Kalafuo-gbene.

References

Local Government Areas in Delta State